James Frederick Bonner (September 1, 1910 – September 13, 1996) was an American molecular biologist,

 a member of the National Academy of Sciences,
 notable for discoveries in plant biochemistry.
Bonner invented a better way to collect natural rubber from trees.
As result of his invention Malaysia nearly doubled its production of natural rubber.
Bonner was instrumental in the invention of a method of mechanical harvesting of oranges. One of his most notable discoveries was finding how histones control gene activity. 
Bonner was professor and professor emeritus of biology at the California Institute of Technology.

Career 
Bonner was born in Ansley, Nebraska in 1910.  He graduated from the University of Utah in 1931 with B.A. degree in chemistry and mathematics. He received the Ph.D. in biology at California Institute of Technology in 1934. Bonner spent the year after his PhD in Europe on a National Research Council fellowship at Utrecht, Leiden and ETH in Zurich. He was a postdoctoral fellow at California Institute of Technology after his return from Europe, then joined the faculty in 1936.

Plant Physiology 
Early in his career, he invented a method for collecting rubber tree exudate (natural rubber) that greatly improved the efficiency of the process. He also invented a mechanical method for harvesting oranges. He studied the timing of processes in plants.

Histones
In the dawn of molecular biology in the 1960s, his interest turned to gene expression, in particular the regulation of production of RNA from genes. Experiments in his laboratory in collaboration with his postdoctoral fellow Ru Chih C. Huang showed that histone, a protein associated with the genes, shuts off gene activity.  If the histone fraction is extracted from isolated chromatin, more RNA is made whereas if histone is added back, the transcription of RNA is greatly decreased. In the course of these experiments, Huang and Bonner discovered DNA-dependent RNA polymerase, but Bonner noted in a biographical article that several other groups discovered the enzyme simultaneously.  They decided to focus on regulation rather than simply RNA production. Bonner continued to work on histones, establishing methods reproducibly to isolate each type of histone, along with graduate student Douglas Fambrough. Eventually they purified individual histones from pea plants and from calf thymus and showed, in collaboration with Emil Smith at UCLA, that the amino acid compositions and sequences of the same type of histone (histone H4) isolated from these widely disparate organisms were virtually identical.

Bonner wrote over 500 scientific papers on all aspects of plant physiology as well as 10 textbooks.

He was elected to the National Academy of Sciences in 1950 in the field of Plant Biology, the American Academy of Arts and Sciences in 1960, and the American Philosophical Society in 1966.

James F. Bonner died on September 13, 1996.

References

External links
National Academy of Sciences Biographical Memoir

1910 births
1996 deaths
American biologists
California Institute of Technology faculty
Members of the United States National Academy of Sciences
University of Utah alumni
California Institute of Technology alumni
People from Custer County, Nebraska
Plant physiologists
American molecular biologists
20th-century American inventors
20th-century biologists
Members of the American Philosophical Society